Point Place is an unincorporated community and census-designated place (CDP) in Natchitoches Parish, Louisiana, United States.

Demographics

References

Unincorporated communities in Louisiana
Census-designated places in Natchitoches Parish, Louisiana
Populated places in Ark-La-Tex